Kalayaan, officially the Municipality of Kalayaan,  is a 3rd class municipality in the province of Laguna, Philippines. According to the 2020 census, it has a population of 24,755 people.

Kalayaan is in the fourth district of the province of Laguna and can be reached three hours by land from Manila. It is the home of approximately 24,214 citizenry. The municipality is home to a hydroelectric power plant, the only pumped storage facility in the Philippines, the Kalayaan Pumped Storage Power Plant located in Brgy. San Juan, that contributes substantially to the income and an economic activity that is anchored on agriculture. It has complied with Ecological Solid Waste Management Act of 2000 (R.A. 9003) by constructing a Category-I Sanitary Landfill under LISCOP, considered one of its kind on the municipal level in the Province of Laguna, which aims to put into practice the segregation and proper disposal of solid waste for the protection of environment.

Kalayaan is roughly rectangular in shape, with a hilly terrain on most of its eastern side, while relatively flat on its western side. Its highest elevations are from 400 to 418 metres. These are found in Sitio Santo Angel, Malaking Pulo, and Cabuhayan in Barangay San Juan, and Sitio Lamao in Barangay San Antonio. Approximately three fourths of the total land area are with terrain 300 metres above sea level. Its lowest points are from 5 to 20 metres along the western sections of Barangays San Juan and Longos towards Laguna de Bay.

The municipality was formerly called Longos until 1956 when it was changed to its present name.

History
A marker posted in the municipal building of Kalayaan reads: “On this site grew a coconut tree with three branches interpreted by our forebears as the future site of our municipal building; three branches being San Juan, Longos and San Antonio.”

Today, the belief had been realized but digging through historical records, it seems that the place is still made up of the three original visitas of Babaye (now Longos), Abacao (now San Juan) and San Pablo (now San Antonio). Babaye got its name when the Spaniards came and found women washing clothes in the brook. When the Spaniards continued their aim to conquer the land and a little north of Babaye, they saw a place where people dried abaca and named the place Abacao. The Spaniards claimed the mountains east of Babaye and named the village found there in honor of San Pablo.

On March 30, 1946, Executive Order No. 127 which ordered the transfer of the seat of government from Longos to San Juan was signed by Pres. Manuel Roxas. From then on, a part of San Juan became the Poblacion, while Longos, San Antonio and the rest of San Juan became its barangays.

Geography
Kalayaan is located approximately 14º20’ to 14°22’ latitude and 121º28’ to 121º38’ longitude. It is bounded by the Municipality of Paete on the north, Lumban on the south, Laguna de Bay on the west and Mauban, Quezon Province on the east. It could be reached via the Manila South Expressway and an artery of the national road southward from Calamba and northward from Pagsanjan.

Barangays

Kalayaan is politically subdivided into 3 barangays:

 Longos (old capital town)
 San Antonio
 San Juan

Climate

Demographics

Economy

See also
List of renamed cities and municipalities in the Philippines

References

External links

[ Philippine Standard Geographic Code]
Philippine Census Information
Local Governance Performance Management System
http://legacy.senate.gov.ph/senators/former_senators/wenceslao_lagumbay.htm

Municipalities of Laguna (province)
Populated places on Laguna de Bay